"A Little Bit Me, a Little Bit You" is a song written by Neil Diamond, recorded by the Monkees in 1967 and released as a single on the Colgems label. The lead vocal was Davy Jones' first on a Monkees single. The single reached No. 1 on the Cashbox Top 100 chart, while on the Billboard Hot 100 it reached No. 2, with "Somethin' Stupid" by Frank Sinatra and Nancy Sinatra keeping it from the top spot.

The record's B-side was Michael Nesmith's "The Girl I Knew Somewhere," which also charted on the Hot 100, peaking at No. 39. "A Little Bit Me, a Little Bit You" was included on the "I'm a Believer" EP released in Europe. Both songs were to be included on the group's album Headquarters, but were dropped from the final track list.

Diamond never recorded the song, as he had done with "I'm a Believer," but he did perform it during his live shows of 1967. A recording exists of one such performance at New York's Bitter End club.

Although the song was originally published by Screen Gems-Columbia Music (BMI), it is now published by Stonebridge Music/EMI Foray Music (SESAC).

Don Kirshner vs. the Monkees 
Music impresario Don Kirshner was in charge of the Brill Building stable of songwriters in New York City (which included Neil Diamond) and was also music supervisor for both the Monkees' television series and their record releases (through Colgems Records). While the band members chose the songs that they would record, Kirshner tended to favor his writing stable for singles. B-sides to singles, which paid the same royalty rates as did A-sides, were reserved as a kind of bonus for the Brill Building writers.

While the Monkees were willing to cooperate with Kirshner, they felt that he was not willing to reciprocate or to listen to their ideas. Michael Nesmith led the band through a struggle for more creative control and the chance to play their own instruments on their records. He wanted the songs that he had written to be featured on Monkees singles, at least as B-sides. Early in 1967, the band recorded two songs for selection as their next single: "All of Your Toys" and a remake of "The Girl I Knew Somewhere," both with Micky Dolenz on lead vocals.

With Diamond's "I'm a Believer" already a hit (the top-selling American single of 1967 and of the Monkees' career), Kirshner afforded Diamond the first chance to write a follow-up single. Kirshner persuaded Davy Jones to fly to New York in February 1967 to record a solo session with producer Jeff Barry, who produced Diamond's newest offerings and his own "She Hangs Out" with session musicians. Kirshner selected "A Little Bit Me, a Little Bit You" and "She Hangs Out" for the next Monkees single. He also authorized pressing and distribution of the single with a picture sleeve (Colgems 66-1003), though he was not authorized to do so without prior approval. He also pressed a number of promo copies bearing the label "My Favorite Monkee – Davy Jones Sings." The personnel involved in the recording included Al Gorgoni, Hugh McCracken and Don Thomas on guitar, Stan Free on clavinet, Artie Butler on organ, Lou Mauro on bass, Thomas Cerone on tambourine and Herbie Lovelle on drums.

The Monkees were already irritated that an entire album, More of the Monkees, had been issued without their input except for the contribution of their vocals. They lobbied the show's producers, Bob Rafelson and Bert Schneider, for an increased role in their music output, now having some self-produced music (working with Chip Douglas of the Turtles) to back them up. When copies of Kirshner's single appeared in Canada and the song began to receive airplay in both Canada and the U.S., Kirshner was dismissed for having issued an unauthorized record. The single was withdrawn in Canada and canceled in the U.S. Because the title had been announced and the song had been heard in the media, "A Little Bit Me, a Little Bit You" was retained as the next A-side, but "She Hangs Out" was dropped as the B-side in favor of "The Girl I Knew Somewhere." (A remake of "She Hangs Out," with the Monkees playing, appeared on their fourth album, Pisces, Aquarius, Capricorn & Jones Ltd.)

While both mono and stereo mixes of "A Little Bit Me, a Little Bit You" were produced, the song's master recordings disappeared after the 1960s, and later issues were sourced from dubs of the earlier mixes. The original stereo mix (with reverb added to the vocals, a longer fade, no handclaps and Jones singing "Oh girl, oh girl" over the bridge) first appeared on the 1969 Greatest Hits album and later on other collections until the multitrack master was rediscovered by Rhino Records. A new stereo remix, more closely matching the mono mix, was issued as a bonus track on Rhino's 2007 double-CD deluxe version of Headquarters.

Personnel

Musicians 
 Guitar: Al Gorgoni
 Organ: Arthur Butler
 Lead vocals: Davy Jones
 Guitar: Don Thomas
 Drums: Herb Lovelle
 Guitar: Hugh McCracken
 Bass guitar: Lou Mauro
 Backing vocals: Neil Diamond
 Clavinet: Stan Free
 Tambourine: Thomas Cerone
 Additional backing vocals and handclaps: Unknown

Technical 
 Producer: Jeff Barry
 Engineer: Dick Bogart
 Engineer: Hank Cicalo
 Engineer: Ray Hall
 Engineer: Richi Schmitt

Reception
In March 1967 Billboard predicted that the single was "destined to become [the Monkees'] third million seller in a row."  Cash Box said that it was "slightly similar in sound to 'I’m A Believer.'"

References

Other sources 
The Monkees Tale, by Eric Lefcowitz (Last Gasp Press, San Francisco, California, 1985), 
The Monkees Greatest Hits, liner notes (Rhino Records)

1967 singles
The Monkees songs
Songs written by Neil Diamond
1967 songs
The Specials songs
Cashbox number-one singles